is a Japanese manga series by Kachō Hashimoto released from 2015 to 2016 in the serialized magazine Monthly Comic Ryū. Prior to becoming a manga series, Cagaster of an Insect Cage was first a dōjinshi series posted on Hashimoto's website, which was published from 2005 to 2013. The series was adapted into an original net anime series produced by Studio Kai and directed by Koichi Chigira, which premiered on Netflix on February 6, 2020.

Synopsis
The series takes place in a post-apocalyptic world that revolves around giant insects eating people.

Media

Manga
Originally published on Kachō Hashimoto's website from 2005 to 2013, Tokuma Shoten picked up the series for publishing under its Comic Ryu brand in 2015. The manga ran for 32 chapters in 7 tankōbon volumes. In 2020, Ablaze Publishing licensed the series for an English release.

Anime
A Netflix anime adaptation of Hashimoto's manga was originally announced in 2018 with Koichi Chigira directing the series at Gonzo. However, Studio Kai, a company spin-off of Gonzo, took over the series' production. Shūichi Kōyama was in charge of the series composition, and Hitomi Kuroishi composed the score; Akihiko Yamashita adapted the character designs for animation. It was released worldwide on Netflix on February 6, 2020. On December 11, 2020, it was announced that Sentai Filmworks has licensed the anime for home media.

Voice cast

Episode list

Notes

References

External links
 
 
 

2020 anime ONAs
Action anime and manga
Anime series based on manga
Japanese webcomics
Japanese-language Netflix original programming
Netflix original anime
Post-apocalyptic anime and manga
Science fiction anime and manga
Seinen manga
Sentai Filmworks
Studio Kai
Tokuma Shoten manga
Webcomics in print